James Wilson (December 14, 1810 – May 14, 1891) was an Irish-born farmer, Methodist preacher and political figure in Ontario. He represented Norfolk North in the Legislative Assembly of Ontario from 1867 to 1871 as a Conservative member.

He was born in Carlow in Ireland, the son of a Methodist preacher  who came to Upper Canada in 1817. In 1832, he married Susanna Shaver. Wilson settled in Chinguacousy Township, moving to Townsend Township three years later. In 1846, Wilson built a steam-powered sawmill. He served on the township council for Townsend, also serving as deputy reeve. Wilson was defeated by John Fitzgerald Clarke when he ran for reelection to the assembly in 1871. He died in 1891 and was buried at Wilsonville Cemetery in Townsend Township.

References

External links

1810 births
1891 deaths
19th-century Methodist ministers
Canadian Methodist ministers
Immigrants to Upper Canada
Irish emigrants to pre-Confederation Ontario
Irish Methodists
Progressive Conservative Party of Ontario MPPs